Prince d'Orléans ("Prince of Orleans" in English) is a title generally used by junior members of the Royal House of France instead of or in addition to the traditional Petit-fils de France.  The current French royal family are descended in the male line from Philippe I, Duke of Orléans the younger son of Louis XIII of France.  Accordingly, they are often called the House of Bourbon-Orléans.  Since the title Petit-fils de France meaning "Grandson of France" is not understood by non-French speakers (or even by French speakers unfamiliar with their history) it can cause confusion in the modern world.  Prince d'Orléans conforms with the standard usage in most surviving monarchies so it is easier for people to understand.  In any case, those entitled Prince d'Orléans or Petit-fils de France use the style Royal Highness.